Splash!!! is Flow's first studio album. The release has two editions: regular and limited. The limited edition includes a bonus DVD. It reached #2 on the Oricon charts  and charted for 18 weeks.

Track listing

References

2003 debut albums
Flow (band) albums